Wania is both a surname and a given name. Notable people with the name include: 

Dominik Wania (born 1981), Polish pianist and composer
Wania Monteiro (born 1986), Cape Verdean rhythmic gymnast

See also
Vânia